Zhang Zhihao may refer to:
 Chang Chih-hao (born 1987), Taiwanese baseball player
 Zhang Zhihao (footballer) (born 2001), Chinese footballer